Capiteq Pty Limited, trading as Airnorth, is a regional airline based at Darwin International Airport in Darwin, Northern Territory, Australia. It operates scheduled and charter services in the Northern Territory, Queensland, Victoria, Western Australia, and East Timor.

Airnorth carries over 300,000 passengers per year.

Aircraft Logistics is a subsidiary company and the Part 145 Engineering division of Airnorth.  Aircrew Logistics is a subsidiary company that employs the pilots and cabin crew for Airnorth.

Airnorth is a member of the Regional Aviation Association of Australia (RAAA).

History

Airnorth was established in 1978 and started operations on 4 July that year as Air North International; it was the result of the merger of Airnorth, Rossair and Tillair.

It operated charter flights only until scheduled services were introduced in 1981. At this time, the airline's fleet included the first turbine powered aircraft in the Northern Territory, a Beechcraft Super King Air as well as a Douglas DC-3. In 1992 the Skyport Group became a major shareholder and in 1993 was sold to Capiteq Ltd and renamed to Airnorth Regional. During the 1990s, Airnorth had a well established regional network and by 1997 had introduced both Fairchild Metro 23 and Embraer EMB 120 Brasilia turboprop aircraft to the fleet.

Beginning in September 1999, Airnorth operated charters from Darwin to Dili, East Timor, on behalf of the United Nations Transitional Administration in East Timor. In 2000, this became a scheduled service, Airnorth's first international route.

In 2007, Airnorth introduced the Embraer ERJ-170 to its fleet, the first jet aircraft operated by the airline. In 2012, it announced a direct service between Darwin and Townsville, the first Australian airline to offer a non-stop connection between these cities.

On 5 February 2015, it was announced that Bristow Helicopters Australia Ltd., a division of the US-based Bristow Group, had acquired an 85 percent controlling interest in Airnorth. Bristow stated that Airnorth would retain its name and brand identity. Later in 2015 Bristow Helicopters Australia purchased the remaining shares to obtain full ownership.

Under Bristow's ownership, Airnorth responded to a downturn in the mining industry, restructuring the route network by withdrawing services to Karratha, Port Hedland and the Gold Coast. A fifth ERJ-170 joined the fleet in 2016. The increased availability of the jets allowed expansion into South East Queensland and Victoria, commencing operations between Wellcamp Airport near Toowoomba to Melbourne and Cairns from March 2016. Within months the airline added further flights from Wellcamp to Townsville with all three new routes codesharing with Qantas.

Bristow Group announced ongoing concerns regarding its financial position and its ability for future operations over the subsequent 12 months. In April 2019 a major shareholder was pushing for the board to be replaced and underperforming Airnorth and Eastern Airlines to be sold.

Destinations

The airline operates over 300 scheduled and contract charter departures weekly, serving 21 domestic and international destinations including: 
Northern Territory
Alice Springs
Bootu Creek*
Darwin
Elcho Island
Gove
Groote Eylandt
Katherine
Maningrida
McArthur River Mine
Milingimbi
Tennant Creek
Queensland
Cairns
Toowoomba
Townsville
Timor Leste
Dili
Western Australia
Broome
Kununurra
Perth
Truscott
In addition to scheduled flights, Airnorth operates charter services for a wide variety of companies including mining & resources, defence and government clients.

Airnorth previously flew to Melbourne, Victoria before terminating the service in early 2022.

Fleet

, the Airnorth fleet consists of the following aircraft:

Incidents and accidents

On 22 March 2010, one of Airnorth's Embraer EMB 120 Brasilia aircraft (registration VH-ANB) crashed into bushland near the RAAF Base Darwin golf course at approximately 10:10 (ACST), shortly after taking off from Darwin International Airport on a training flight. The two crew members, who were the only people on board, were killed.

References

External links

Airnorth

Airlines established in 1978
Australian companies established in 1978
Regional Aviation Association of Australia
Companies based in Darwin, Northern Territory
Qantas